The Slovenian Second League of Handball, also known as the 1. B MRL, is the second level handball league in Slovenia. It is organized by the Handball Federation of Slovenia. As of the 2022–23 season, the league consists of 14 teams.

Clubs
As of the 2022–23 season
Alples Železniki
Črnomelj
Dol Hrastnik
Grosuplje
Izola
Jadran Hrpelje-Kozina
Ljubljana
Mokerc - Ig
Moškanjci - Gorišnica
Radovljica
Sevnica
Škofljica
Šmartno
Velika Nedelja

List of seasons

External links
Handball Federation of Slovenia 

Handball competitions in Slovenia
1991 establishments in Slovenia
Sports leagues established in 1991